{{DISPLAYTITLE:C4H4N2}}
The molecular formula C4H4N2 may refer to:

 Diazines
 Pyrazine
 Pyridazine
 Pyrimidine
 Succinonitrile, or butanedinitrile

Molecular formulas